Colin Gordon Johnstone (14 September 1921 – 10 November 1991) was a New Zealand rowing coxswain who mostly competed in coxed fours. He won a gold medal at the 1950 British Empire Games, and competed at the 1952 and 1956 Summer Olympics.

References

1921 births
1991 deaths
New Zealand male rowers
Olympic rowers of New Zealand
Rowers at the 1952 Summer Olympics
Rowers at the 1956 Summer Olympics
Rowers at the 1950 British Empire Games
Commonwealth Games gold medallists for New Zealand
Commonwealth Games medallists in rowing
Medallists at the 1950 British Empire Games